Empis livida is a species of dance fly, in the fly family Empididae. It is included in the subgenus Kritempis of the genus Empis. The male's abdomen is brownish, and his wings appear faintly brown and clouded. The female's abdomen is gray and her wings are clear. E. livida lives in hedgerows, feeding on the nectar of several species of Rosaceae, several species of Asteraceae, and Heracleum sphondylium nectar; they also feed on other insects. They live all across temperate and Northern Europe, the only species with such a wide distribution. E. livida larvae are also carnivorous and live in damp soil and leaf litter. Adults fly in between April to July.

References

Empis
Asilomorph flies of Europe
Flies described in 1758
Taxa named by Carl Linnaeus